The New Caledonian myzomela (Myzomela caledonica) is a species of bird in the honeyeater family Meliphagidae. The species is sometimes considered to be conspecific with (the same species as) the scarlet myzomela of Australia.

It is endemic to New Caledonia, where it occurs on the island of Grande Terre and the Isle of Pines. In New Caledonia its natural habitat is humid rainforest, stunted hill forest and savanna woodland. It has also moved into modified habitat such as plantations and gardens.

It is around 11 cm in length and typically weighs 6.5 to 8 grams. The males are slightly heavier than the females. The plumage of this species also varies by sex, with the male having a scarlet head, breast and back, black wings and tail and a white belly and rump. The female has a dull brown head, breast and back with a slight red wash on the face, and duller wings and belly. Juvenile birds resemble the female.

References

Endemic birds of New Caledonia
Myzomela
Birds described in 1879
Taxonomy articles created by Polbot